Heron Road (Ottawa Road #16) is a major road in Ottawa, Ontario, Canada. It runs from Walkley Road at an angle to the Rideau River, where it turns into Baseline Road. Heron is home to the Public Works and Government Services Canada headquarters, the Sir Leonard Tilley Building, the Canada Post headquarters, and the Edward Drake Building (at its junction with Riverside Drive). It is also home to St. Patrick's Intermediate High School and Herongate Mall.

Heron Road starts on the Heron Road Bridge which crosses the Rideau River, Rideau Canal, and part of Vincent Massey Park.

Roads in Ottawa